The Petron Blaze Spikers were a professional women's volleyball team that played in the Philippine Super Liga (PSL) from 2013 to 2020. After the cancellation of the 2020 season of the PSL due to the COVID-19 pandemic in 2020, the team took a leave of absence from the league and released all its players. The team was owned by Petron Corporation. The company's involvement in volleyball began in 2002 when it established the Petron Ladies Beach Volleyball Tournament.

Team history
Petron became the first team to sweep a PSL tournament with a 13–0 record and claim the 2015 All-Filipino championship, its second consecutive PSL title. At their stint in the 2015 Asian Women's Club Volleyball Championship in Ha Nam, Vietnam, the team finished at 8th place with only one game won out of six matches played.

On September 12, 2016, the team parted ways with coach George Pascua. He was replaced by Shaq Delos Santos.

Due to the COVID-19 pandemic, the 2020 season of the PSL was cancelled. Prior to the beginning of 2021 season, the team, along with two other member teams took an indefinite leave of absence from the league and released all of its players.

Name changes

Indoor volleyball
Petron Blaze Spikers (2013-2015, 2017-present)
Petron Tri-Activ Spikers (2016)

Beach volleyball
Petron Sprint 4T (Petron Team A - 2015-2017)
Petron XCS (Petron Team B - 2015-2017; solo team - 2018)

Current roster
For the 2020 PSL Grand Prix Conference:

Position main 

The following is the Petron Blaze Spikers roster in the: 2020 PSL Grand Prix Conference

Head coach
  Emil Lontoc
Assistant Coach(es)
  Benjamin Mape
  Kirk Beliran
Team manager
  Ramon Cruz
  M Reyes
| valign="top" |

Doctor
  Jessica Lavarias
Physical Therapist
  A. Mallari

 Team Captain
 Import
 Draft Pick
 Rookie
 Inactive
 Suspended
 Free Agent
 Injured

Previous roster

For the 2018 PSL All-Filipino Conference:

Head coach
  Cesael delos Santos
Assistant Coach(es)
  Christian Fernandez
  Errol Collantes
Team manager
  Ramon Cruz
  M Reyes
| valign="top" |

Doctor
  Jessica Lavarias
Physical Therapist
  A. Mallari

 Team Captain
 Import
 Draft Pick
 Rookie
 Inactive
 Suspended
 Free Agent
 Injured

For the 2018 PSL Invitational Cup:

Head coach
  Cesael delos Santos
Assistant Coach(es)
  Christian Fernandez
  Kirk Beliran
Team manager
  Ramon Cruz
  M Reyes
| valign="top" |

Doctor
  Jessica Lavarias
Physical Therapist
  A. Mallari

 Team Captain
 Import
 Draft Pick
 Rookie
 Inactive
 Suspended
 Free Agent
 Injured

For the 2018 PSL Beach Volleyball Challenge Cup:

Petron XCS

For the 2018 PSL Grand Prix Conference:

Head coach
  Cesael delos Santos
Assistant Coach(es)
  Christian Fernandez
  Kirk Beliran
Team manager
  Ramon Cruz
  M Reyes
| valign="top" |

Doctor
  Jessica Lavarias
Physical Therapist
  A. Mallari

 Team Captain
 Import
 Draft Pick
 Rookie
 Inactive
 Suspended
 Free Agent
 Injured

For the 2017 PSL Beach Volleyball Challenge Cup:

Petron XCS

Petron Sprint 4T

For the 2017 PSL Invitational Cup:

Head coach
  Cesael Delos Santos
Assistant Coach(es)
  Edjet Mabbayad
  Errol Collantes
Team manager
  Ramon Cruz
| valign="top" |

Physical Therapist
  Kirk Beliran
| valign="top" |
 Setter
 Middle Blocker
 Opposite Hitter
 Outside Hitter
 Libero

 Team Captain
 Import
 Draft Pick
 Rookie
 Inactive
 Suspended
 Free Agent
 Injured

For the 2017 PSL All-Filipino Conference:

Head coach
  Cesael delos Santos
Assistant Coach(es)
  Christian Fernandez
  Errol Collantes
Team manager
  Ramon Cruz
| valign="top" |

Doctor
  Kirk Beliran
Physical Therapist
  Jessica Lavarias

 Team Captain
 Import
 Draft Pick
 Rookie
 Inactive
 Suspended
 Free Agent
 Injured

For the 2017 PSL Grand Prix Conference:

Head coach
  Cesael delos Santos
Assistant Coach(es)
  Christian Fernandez
  Errol Collantes
Team manager
  Ramon Cruz
  M Reyes
| valign="top" |

Doctor
  Jessica Lavarias
Physical Therapist
  Kirk Beliran

 Team Captain
 Import
 Draft Pick
 Rookie
 Inactive
 Suspended
 Free Agent
 Injured

For the 2016 PSL Grand Prix Conference:

For the 2016 PSL All-Filipino Conference:

Honors

Team

Individual

Team captains
  Roxanne Pimentel-So (2013)
  Karla Bello (2013)
  Gretchen Ho (2014)
  Mecaila Irish May Morada (2015)
  Aiza Maizo-Pontillas (2016, 2016)
  Frances Xinia Molina (2016 - 2017, 2018, 2018, 2019, 2019)
  Lindsay Stalzer (2018)
  Katherine Bell (2019, 2020)

Coaches
 Ma. Vilet Ponce-de Leon (2013)
 George Pascua (2014–2016)
 Shaq Delos Santos (2016–2019)
 Emil Lontoc (2020)

Transactions

Grand Prix

Addition
 Dennise Michelle Lazaro (Cocolife Asset Managers)
 Stephanie Niemer (Import)
 Katherine Bell (Import)

Subtraction
 Ria Duremdes (FEU Lady Tamaraws)
 Cherry Ann Rondina (UST Golden Tigresses)

Invitational

Addition

Subtraction

All-Filipino

Addition

Subtraction

Grand Prix

Addition
 Princess Ira Gaiser
 Chlodia Eiriel Ysabella Cortez
 Luth Malaluan
 Angelica Legacion

Subtraction
 Marivic Velaine Meneses (Generika-Ayala Lifesavers)
 April Ross Hingpit (Generika-Ayala Lifesavers)
 Carmina Aganon (Foton Tornadoes)
 Shiela Marie Pineda (Generika-Ayala Lifesavers)

Invitational

Addition
 Ivana Agudo
 Bernadeth Pons (from )
 Cherry Rondina (from )

Subtraction
 Luth Malaluan (to Smart–Army Giga Hitters)

All-Filipino

Addition

Subtraction

Invitational

Additions
 Mika Reyes (Signed by Petron last January 11, 2017)
 Rhea Katrina Dimaculangan
 Carmela Tunay
 Gianes Dolar
 Dancel Dusaran

Subtractions
 Mary Grace Masangkay
 Mecaila Irish May Morada
 Iumi Yongco
 Cherry Rose Nunag
 Jennylyn Reyes (Moves to Foton Tornadoes)

All-Filipino

Addition
 Marivic Velaine Meneses
 Bernadeth Pons
 Remy Palma
 Cherry Rondina
 Ria Duremdes
 Toni Rose Basas

Subtraction
 Christine Joy Rosario (Moves to Foton Tornadoes)
 Mayette Zapanta
 Gianes Dolar
 Dancel Dusaran

Grand Prix

All-time players

Local players

(A-F)
 Kara Acevedo
 Carmina Aganon
 Ivana Agudo (2018–present)
 Toni Rose Basas (2017)
 Karla Bello
 Judy Anne Caballejo
 Jozza Cabalsa
 Fille Cainglet–Cayetano
 Chlodia Eiriel Ysabella Cortez (2018–present)
 Jessica Curato
 Rachel Anne Daquis
 Ana Ma. Del Mundo
 Sandra Delos Santos
 Rhea Dimaculangan (2017–present)
 Gianes Dolar (2017)
 Ria Duremdes (2017), (2018–present)
 Dancel Dusaran (2017)

(G-L)
 Princess Ira Gaiser (2018–present)
 Melissa Gohing
 April Ross Hingpit
 Gretchen Ho
 Mic-Mic Laborte
 Angelica Legacion (2018–present)

(M-R)
 Luth Malaluan (2018)
 Aleona Denise Santiago–Manabat
 Aby Maraño
 Mary Grace Masangkay
 Marivic Velaine Meneses (2017)
 Paneng Mercado
 Alexa Micek
 Frances Xinia Molina (2015–present)
 Mecaila Irish May Morada
 Kyle Angela Negrito
 Cherry Rose Nunag
 Maika Ortiz
 Mary Remy Joy Palma (2016, 2017–present)
 Ivy Perez
 Shiela Marie Pineda
 Bernadeth Pons (2016, 2017, 2018–present)
 Aiza Maizo-Pontillas (2015–present)
 Jennylyn Reyes (2014–2016)
 Mika Reyes (2017–present)
 Cherry Rondina (2017, 2018–present)
 Christine Joy Rosario (2016–2017)

(S-Z)
 Roxanne Pimentel-So
 Charo Soriano
 Angeline Tabaquero
 Joanna Torrijos
 Carmela Tunay (2017–present)
 Iumi Yongco
 Mayette Zapanta (2014–2017)

Imports

(A-F)
  Erica Adachi (2014, 2015)
  Katherine Bell (2018)
  Alaina Bergsma (2014)
  Yuri Fukuda (2017–2018)

(G-L)
  Hillary Hurley (2017–2018)
  Rupia Inck (2015)

(M-R)
  Stephanie Niemer (2016)

(S-Z)
  Lindsay Stalzer (2017–2018)
  Shinako Tanaka (2013)
  Misao Tanyama (2013)
  Serena Warner (2016)

References

External links 
 PSL-Petron Blaze Spikers Page
 Petron Blaze Spikers Twitter Account

Women's volleyball teams in the Philippines
Philippine Super Liga
2013 establishments in the Philippines
Volleyball clubs established in 2013